Telchin syphax is a moth in the Castniidae family. It is widely distributed in the Amazon basin in South America.

The wingspan is 100–130 mm. Adults are very dark brown. There is a slightly sinuous white band on the forewing that crosses the discal cell from the costal margin to the inner angle. There is a row of six spots found at the apical region of the wing. These spots are divided into two groups of three. There is a row of seven to eight red spots found on the hindwing, running parallel to the external margin.

Subspecies
Telchin syphax syphax (Surinam, the Guianas, Venezuela, Trinidad)
Telchin syphax completa (Lathy, 1922) (Brazil)

References

Moths described in 1775
Castniidae
Taxa named by Johan Christian Fabricius